Alan Robin "Ponty" Reid (12 April 1929 – 16 November 1994) was a New Zealand rugby union player. A halfback, Reid represented  at a provincial level, and was a member of the New Zealand national side, the All Blacks, from 1951 to 1957. He played 17 matches for the All Blacks including 10 as captain, and appeared in five Tests. Reid was diagnosed with frontotemporal dementia in 1985, and he died in 1994.

References

1929 births
1994 deaths
Sportspeople from Te Kūiti
People educated at New Plymouth Boys' High School
New Zealand rugby union players
New Zealand international rugby union players
Waikato rugby union players
Rugby union scrum-halves
Rugby union players from Waikato